Go Away Mr. Tumor is 2015 Chinese comedy-drama film.  It is based on the life of comic book artist Xiong Dun, who after her cancer diagnosis authored a popular webcomic that became a sensation in China.  Xiong died in 2012 at the age of 30.

Directed by Han Yan and starring Bai Baihe and Daniel Wu, the film  was released on August 13, 2015, and became a box office hit.

The film was selected as the Chinese entry for the Best Foreign Language Film at the 88th Academy Awards but it was not nominated.

"Go Away, Mr. Tumor" was featured in the 5th annual China International Co-Production Film Screenings, hosted by the Motion Picture Association of America and China's Film Bureau of the State Administration of Press, Publication, Radio, Film and Television.

Cast
 Bai Baihe as Xiong Dun
 Daniel Wu as Doctor Liang
 Zhang Zixuan as Amy
 Li Yuan as Xia Meng
 Liu Ruilin as Xiao Xia
 Cheng Yi as Lao Zheng
 Li Jianyi as  Xiong Dun's Father
 Liu Lili as  Xiong Dun's Mother
 Shen Teng as Ex-boyfriend

Box office
The film earned US$29.75 million in its opening weekend and topped the Chinese box office replacing Monster Hunt. Once advance ticket sales were factored in, Go Away Mr. Tumor registered a cume of US$31.52 million, with 182,066 showings and 5.46 million admissions in four days, according to data from the research group Entgroup.

See also
 List of submissions to the 88th Academy Awards for Best Foreign Language Film
 List of Chinese submissions for the Academy Award for Best Foreign Language Film

References

External links
 

2015 films
Chinese romantic comedy-drama films
2015 romantic comedy films
Films based on webcomics
Films based on Chinese comics
IMAX films
Live-action films based on comics
Wanda Pictures films
Films directed by Han Yan
2010s Mandarin-language films